Michael Ferrante (born 28 April 1981) is an Australian former footballer. He is currently the senior men's head coach of Essendon Royals SC.

Biography
He attended St. Joseph's College Melbourne from years 1992–1997 being a star week in week out for his school side. He came through the ranks at the Australian Institute of Sport and from there he moved on to the youth team at West Ham United. He captained the team in one of the games of the 9–0 aggregate FA Youth Cup Final triumph over Coventry in 1999. The team included Joe Cole, Michael Carrick who went on to become established Premiership and England players plus fellow Australian and current Australian international Richard Garcia.

He had a spell in Italy with Comprensorio Stabia and Serie C side Benevento Calcio before returning to Australia to join Fawkner Blues in 2004. He joined Melbourne's inaugural A-League squad for season 2005–06 and featured in all of Melbourne Victory league games. Following the signings of Fred and Grant Brebner he was frozen out of the squad for the second season and struggled to make appearances. He made 21 appearances for Melbourne in 2005–06, scoring one goal, and five appearances in 2006–07.

After Victory released him from his contract by mutual consent in February 2007, new A-League team Wellington Phoenix signed Ferrante on a two-year deal for the start of the A-League 2007-08 season.

In 2010, he returned home to Melbourne, signing for local club Richmond Eagles mid-season. On 12 July 2012 he announced that a major back injury would prevent him participating in the VPL for the remainder of the 2012. By mutual consent his contract was terminated and Richmond released him to sign with Pascoe Vale who sit top of League State 1 and who are managed by his brother Vitale.

A-League career statistics 
Correct as of 24 February 2010

Honours
Melbourne Victory
 A-League Championship: 2006–07
 A-League Premiership: 2006–07

References

External links
 Wellington Phoenix profile
 Oz Football profile

1981 births
Living people
Australian people of Italian descent
Soccer players from Melbourne
Australian expatriate soccer players
Association football midfielders
West Ham United F.C. players
Melbourne Victory FC players
Wellington Phoenix FC players
A-League Men players
Benevento Calcio players
Expatriate association footballers in New Zealand
Australian soccer players
People educated at St Joseph's College, Melbourne
Australian expatriate sportspeople in England
Expatriate footballers in England
Australian expatriate sportspeople in Italy
Expatriate footballers in Italy
Australian expatriate sportspeople in New Zealand